Valentina Mora Trujillo (born November 26, 1997) is a Colombian model and beauty pageant titleholder who was the 1st Runner-Up of Señorita Colombia 2022.

Early life 
Valentina was born in Medellín, Colombia on November 26, 1997. She studied high school at the Colegio Colombo Británico (British Colombian School) of Envigado, Antioquia. a bilingual institution, where she learned to speak English, addition to her native Spanish. She pursued a bachelor's degree in social communication at the Eafit University.

Pageantry

Señorita Antioquia 2022 
Valentina Mora's career in beauty pageants began in July 2022, when she was deginated the new Señorita Antioquia for the next edition of Miss Colombia, which would take place during the month of November of the same year.

Señorita Colombia 2022 
Mora represented Antioquia in Señorita Colombia 2022 and finished Virreina Nacional (1st Runner-Up) to Sofía Osío of Atlántico.

Miss Supranational 2023 
She was appointed as Miss Colombia Supranational in February 2023, and will represent Colombia at Miss Supranational 2023.

References

External links 

 

1997 births
Living people
Colombian beauty pageant winners
People from Antioquia Department
People from Medellín